The 2021–22 Bangladesh Premier League, also known as BPL 8 or Bangabandhu BPL 2021–22 presented  by BBS Cables and powered by Walton (for sponsorship reasons), was the eighth season of the Bangladesh Premier League (BPL), the top-level professional Twenty20 cricket league in Bangladesh, organized by the Bangladesh Cricket Board (BCB). The season was scheduled to start from March 2021. However, the tournament was postponed and rescheduled to be held from 21 January to 18 February 2022.

A franchise from Barisal was announced as taking part since Barisal Bulls played in 2016–17 Bangladesh Premier League. Comilla Victorians returned after the hiatus of one season. On 12 December 2021, all six teams were announced, with the exclusion of Rangpur Rangers and the defending champion Rajshahi Royals.

In the final match, Comilla Victorians defeated Fortune Barishal by 1 run to win their third BPL title. Comilla Victorians' bowling Alrounder Sunil Narine won Player of the match for his all-round performances and Fortune Barishal captain Shakib Al Hasan won Player of the Tournament award for his all-round performances.
Will Jacks was the leading run scorer in the tournament with 414 runs while Mustafizur Rahman was the leading wicket-taker with 19 wickets.

Changes of rules
After confirming all franchises, BCB changed the rule of playing condition as:
 Each team is allowed to play a maximum of three overseas players in a match.
 Each franchise is allowed to sign one local players from any category as direct signing prior to the players' draft, and a maximum of 3 foreign players can be recruited as direct signing.
 Each franchise is allowed to sign a minimum of 10 and a maximum of 14 local players while a minimum of 3 and a maximum of 8 can be signed, in the case of foreign players.

Draft and squads 
The players' draft was held on 27 December 2021.

Sri Lanka Cricket did not provide a no-objection certificate to some of its players due to FTP commitments.

Venues

Teams and standings

Points Table 

  advances to the Qualifier 1
  advances to the Eliminator

League progression

League stage

Phase 1 (Dhaka)

Phase 2 (Chittagong)

Phase 3 (Dhaka)

Phase 4 (Sylhet)

Phase 5 (Dhaka)

Playoffs

Eliminator

Qualifiers
Qualifier 1

Qualifier 2

Final

Statistics

Most runs

Most wickets

Highest team totals

References

External links
 Series home at ESPNCricinfo

Bangladesh Premier League seasons
2021 in Bangladeshi cricket
Bangladesh Premier League, 2021-22